Creswell High School may refer to:

Creswell High School (Oregon), Creswell, Oregon
Creswell High School (North Carolina),  Creswell, North Carolina